Gumilevia is a genus of moths in the family Cossidae.

Species
 Gumilevia konkistador Yakovlev, 2011
 Gumilevia minettii Yakovlev, 2011
 Gumilevia timora Yakovlev, 2011
 Gumilevia zhiraph Yakovlev, 2011

References

 , 2011: Catalogue of the Family Cossidae of the Old World. Neue Entomologische Nachrichten, 66: 1-129.

External links
Natural History Museum Lepidoptera generic names catalog

Cossinae
Moth genera